Jade Windley (born 22 April 1990 in Lincolnshire) is a British former tennis player.

In her career, Windley won three singles and 16 doubles titles on the ITF Women's Circuit. On 7 April 2014, she reached her best singles ranking of world No. 279, and she peaked at No. 159 in the doubles rankings.

ITF finals

Singles (3–3)

Doubles: 25 (16–9)

References

External links

 
 

1990 births
Living people
People from East Lindsey District
British female tennis players
English female tennis players
Tennis people from Lincolnshire